Poecilasthena sthenommata is a moth in the family Geometridae. It is found in Australia, where it is known from Queensland and New South Wales.

Adults are dull green with broad white bands across the wings.

References

Moths described in 1922
Poecilasthena
Moths of Australia